Grizzly Creek may refer to:

Grizzly Creek Redwoods State Park
Grizzly Creek, tributary of the Van Duzen River (California)
Grizzly Creek, tributary of the North Fork Trinity River (California)
Grizzly Creek, tributary of the Yuba River (California)
Grizzly Creek, tributary of the Colorado River (Colorado)
Grizzly Creek, tributary of the North Platte River (Nebraska)
Grizzly Creek, tributary of the Imnaha River (Oregon )